Errol Trzebinski (born 24 June 1936 in Gloucester), is a British writer of books on the Happy Valley set of colonial Kenya. 

Her book Silence Will Speak was a source for the script of the 1985 Hollywood movie Out of Africa. Her late husband Sbish Trzebinski appears as a drunkard in the film and is slapped by Meryl Streep when he insults her.
Errol cast doubt on the authorship of West with the Night, claiming Beryl's 3rd husband Raoul C Schumacher was the ghost writer.

Personal life
She lives and works in Lamu Island, Kenya. Her son is the painter Tonio Trzebinski, who was murdered in Kenya in 2001.

Works
Silence Will Speak: A Study of the Life of Denys Finch Hatton and His Relationship With Karen Blixen (1977); 
The Kenya Pioneers: The Frontiersmen of an Adopted Land (1985); 
The Lives of Beryl Markham: Out of Africa's Hidden Free Spirit and Denys Finch Hatton's Last Great Love (1993); 
The Life and Death of Lord Erroll: The Truth Behind the Happy Valley Murder (2000).

See also
Karen Blixen
Denys Finch Hatton
Beryl Markham
Josslyn Hay, 22nd Earl of Erroll

References

British writers
Living people
1936 births